Bolbe is a genus of praying mantises, sometimes called by the common name ground mantis, that are found in Australia.

Species
The genus includes the following species:
Bolbe lowi
Bolbe maia
Bolbe nigra 
Bolbe pallida
Bolbe pygmaea

See also
 List of Australian stick insects and mantids
 :Category:Mantodea of Oceania
 List of mantis genera and species

References

 
Mantodea of Oceania
Insects of Australia
Nanomantidae